Cléophas Beausoleil (June 19, 1845 – October 4, 1904) was a Canadian journalist, publisher, office holder, lawyer, and politician.

Born in Saint-Félix-de-Valois, Canada East, he was a journalist and lawyer before entering politics as an alderman with the Montreal City Council in 1882. He was acclaimed in 1885 and resigned in 1888. He was acclaimed again in 1892 and served until he was appointed postmaster in 1899. He was elected to the House of Commons of Canada in the 1887 federal election in the riding of Berthier. A Liberal, he was re-elected in 1891 and acclaimed in 1896. He resigned in 1899, when Canadian Prime Minister Wilfrid Laurier appointed him postmaster in Montreal.

In 1868, he married Henriette Lapointe. Beausoleil died in Saint-Gabriel-de-Brandon at the age of 59 after an extended illness.

Electoral record

References

External links
 

1845 births
1904 deaths
Liberal Party of Canada MPs
Members of the House of Commons of Canada from Quebec
Montreal city councillors
Canadian postmasters